HMF Engineering, Inc. is an American manufacturer of performance-enhancing aftermarket exhaust systems. HMF is a worldwide manufacturer and distributor of ATV, UTV and motorcycle aftermarket exhaust systems. HMF Performance manufactures aftermarket exhaust systems for Honda, Suzuki, Kawasaki, Yamaha, Can-Am, KTM, Polaris, Kymco and Arctic Cat ATVs (all-terrain vehicles) and dirt bikes, as well as Honda, Suzuki, Yamaha, Kawasaki, BMW and Ducati motorcycles.

Background
HMF Engineering, Inc. was founded in 1997 by Hans Luenger in Cleveland, Ohio. Hans started the company by himself in his garage building private label aftermarket performance Ducati Motorcycle exhausts for Fast by Ferracci. As the workload increased, Hans hired three of his friends and bought a building in Brooklyn, Ohio in 1999 to help with the manufacturing process and diversify the product line.

Chronology
1997: HMF Engineering founded by Hans Luenger in Cleveland, Ohio.

1999: Hans hires three of his friends and buys building to support manufacturing process.

1999: Hans begins motorcycle racing to better understand the market and expands product line of sport and street motorcycle exhausts to better serve the sport.

2002: Hans refinances his own home for a second time (first in 1999) and sells his personal Corvette and FZR 1,000 to help keep HMF Engineering alive.

2002: HMF reinvents itself by delving into the ATV exhaust market.

2003: Hans teams HMF up with pro GNCC ATV racer, John Gallagher, to boost sales.

2004: Sales steadily rise throughout the 2004 race season.

Penland Pro
Currently retired from the HMF lineup, the Penland Pro was backed by the ATV legend Mike Penland, the Penland Pro Series was developed for off-road racers and trail riders. The Penland Pro comes with a Torque Range Modifier.  The removable Torque Range Modifier increases power in the low-to-mid RPM range.

References

Manufacturing companies established in 1997
Exhaust systems
Motorcycle parts manufacturers
Automotive companies of the United States